Ann Ter-Pogossian (July 13, 1932 - April 17, 2022), was an American oil painter who exhibited in the United States, England, Spain, France, and Italy. Works included landscapes, still lifes, portraits, figures in motion, and commentaries on current events. One review described her work as using "knowledge of the great artistic movements of the past … to re-evaluate and reinterpret familiar themes concerning the problems of figures in movement, perspective and iconography." A common theme in later works is the roles of women in society.

She was born and spent most of her life around St. Louis, Missouri, but also resided in Liberty Corner, New Jersey. Some of her early works document and interpret the history and development of downtown St. Louis.

Her later works are signed Ann Ter-Pogossian, but other signatures include Ann Scott, Ann Scott Dodson, Ann Dodson, ATP, and ANN.

Education
 
 Bachelor of Fine Arts, Washington University, St. Louis, Missouri. (now housed under the Sam Fox School of Design & Visual Arts) She studied under Warner Trivis and Fred Conway. 
 Master's degree in Egyptology, Washington University, St. Louis, Missouri. Key paper: "African Tribes as Represented in Egyptian Art."

Selected Exhibitions

 City Art Museum of St. Louis, St. Louis (now St. Louis Art Museum) 1955, 1961, 1964
 Gallerie de la Tournell Paris (solo), France, 1973
 Missouri Botanical Gardens, 1979
 Viridian Gallery, New York, 1988 (solo)
 Ariel Gallery, New York, 1989
 Boody Fine Arts, Metropolitan Life Building, 1991 (solo)
 Biennale Internazionale Dell'Arte Contemporanea, Florence, 2003
 Biennale Internazionale Dell'Arte Contemporanea, Florence, 2005
 Amsterdam-Whitney Gallery, New York, 2008-2012

Awards

Lorenzo il Magnifico Lifetime Achievement Award, Biennale Internazionale Dell'Arte Contemporanea, 2003

Personal life

Ann had two sons and a daughter by her marriage to Rowland Wheeler Dodson Jr (19271964). After Rowland's death, she married pioneering nuclear medicine physicist Michel Ter-Pogossian of St. Louis in 1966. The couple were residents of Clayton, Missouri. 

Ann and Michel traveled extensively and were gourmets, scuba divers, and big game hunters. Michel died on June 19, 1996, of apparent myocardial infarction in Paris, where the couple were vacationing.

Ann loved entertaining at her home, filled with antiques and artworks, and served gourmet meals with fine wine. In her later years, Ann knitted thousands of colourful hats, which were donated to hospitals and shelters, and distributed to family members.

References

External links

 Ann Dodson Ter-Pogossian Art 

1932 births
2022 deaths
American women painters
American contemporary painters
Artists from Missouri
20th-century American painters
20th-century American women artists
Washington University in St. Louis alumni
Sam Fox School of Design & Visual Arts alumni